The Gumdrop stories are a series of 37 children's books written and illustrated by Val Biro. They concern a 1926 Austin 12 hp four cylinder (Austin Clifton twelve four) called "Gumdrop", who gets involved in various adventures. The car is real and was in the author's possession, but the stories are fictional. The first book was The Adventures of a Vintage Car (1966) and the last was Gumdrop's School Adventure (2001). His adventures have included such tales as an encounter with the Loch Ness Monster where Gumdrop and his owner helped to protect the monster being exploited for publicity, a meeting with Father Christmas where Gumdrop helped him deliver presents, and helping an elephant escape an abusive zookeeper and deliver him to a safari park which they soon help to rescue from being destroyed by bulldozers. Given Gumdrop's age, various stories feature a sub-plot of his owners needing to find replacement parts for him as certain components become worn out over time, ranging from a new starter to a complete replacement of his engine, often made more difficult by the fact that these parts are no longer being manufactured directly. 

A television series of the same name and based on the original books was produced in the 1990s and narrated by Nigel Planer.

Titles

References

Series of children's books
Fictional cars
Book series introduced in 1966